Muppane is a town located in Monaragala District, Uva Province of Sri Lanka.

The area was developed for rubber cultivation in the early 1900s and the town expanded considerably after the bridging and improvement of the road from Wellawaya.

Heritage and cultural attractions
Muppane Rajamaha Vihara, also known as Viharamulla Vihara, is a Buddhist temple is located in Muppane. It is gazetted as an Archaeological Protected Site by the government in June 2008. It was built in the early Kandy period, based on the paintings and the sculptures of the same period found adorning the temple building.

See also
List of towns in Uva

External links

References

Populated places in Uva Province
Archaeological protected monuments in Monaragala District